Acheloos is a former municipality in the Karditsa regional unit, Thessaly, Greece. Since the 2011 local government reform it is part of the municipality Argithea, of which it is a municipal unit. The municipal unit has an area of 87.430 km2. It is named after the Acheloos River. Population 1,168 (2011). The seat of the municipality was in Vragkiana.

References

Populated places in Karditsa (regional unit)

el:Δήμος Αργιθέας#Αχελώου